The 1st Metro Manila Film Festival, also known then as the 1975 Metropolitan Film Festival, was held on September 21, 1975, in Manila to commemorate the third anniversary of the continuation of Martial Law.

The film Diligin Mo ng Hamog ang Uhaw na Lupa received most of the 1975 awards, winning six major awards including the Best Film and Best Actor for Joseph Estrada. Batu-Bato sa Langit and Kapitan Kulas came in second and third respectively. The feature film Araw-Araw, Gabi-Gabi won one award, Best Actress for Charito Solis.

Nora Aunor's entry, NV Productions' Batu-Bato sa Langit (directed by Luciano B. Carlos), won as 3rd Best Picture. Vilma Santos, on the other hand, gave a notable performance in Roma Films' Karugtong ang Kahapon.

That time, Aunor and Santos were at their peak of their careers: their lives and the movies they made were being followed closely, compared, watched, praised, and scrutinized by both fans and critics. Their storied and fierce rivalry dominated the Philippine movie industry for years. In fact, one could argue that even to this day, a Filipino movie fan is either a Noranian (Nora Aunor's fans) or a Vilmanian (Vilma Santos' fans).

Entries

Awards
Winners are listed first and highlighted in boldface.

Multiple awards

References

External links
 Metro Manila Film Festival: Awards for 1975 at the Internet Movie Database

Metro Manila Film Festival
1975 MMFF
MMFF
MMFF